In enzymology, an aminoimidazolase is an enzyme that catalyzes the chemical reaction

4-aminoimidazole + H2O  unidentified product + NH3

Thus, the two substrates of this enzyme are 4-aminoimidazole and H2O, whereas its two products are unidentified product and NH3.

This enzyme belongs to the family of hydrolases, those acting on carbon-nitrogen bonds other than peptide bonds, specifically in cyclic amidines.  The systematic name of this enzyme class is 4-aminoimidazole aminohydrolase. This enzyme is also called 4-aminoimidazole hydrolase.  This enzyme participates in purine metabolism.  It employs one cofactor, iron.

References 

 

EC 3.5.4
Iron enzymes
Enzymes of unknown structure